Cyber police are police departments or government agencies in charge of stopping cybercrime. Examples include:

Chinese Internet police, internet crime division of the Ministry of Industry and Information Technology in China (website domain: cyberpolice.cn)
Jingjing and Chacha, cartoon police mascots and the provincial Internet Content Provider license requirement for website domains registered in China

FBI Cyber Division, internet crime division of the Criminal, Cyber, Response, and Services Branch (CCRSB), of Federal Bureau of Investigation, United States

Iranian Cyber Police, a unit of the Islamic Republic of Iran Police
Cyber Crime Investigation Cell, of Mumbai Police, India
Cyber Police, the Hi-Tech Crime Enquire Cell  of the Kerala Police

Cyber police or Cybercops may also refer to:

On the Internet
Internet police, usually referred to as means of enforcing censorship on the Internet
Internet forum moderators
The Jessi Slaughter meme

In the arts and entertainment
 Cyber Police, a fictional organization in the 1990 original video animation Cyber City Oedo 808
 Cyber Police ESWAT, a 1989 video game
 "Cyberpolice", a track in Balance, a 2004 album by Kim-Lian
 Dennou Keisatsu Cybercop, a 1988 Japanese television series
 Corporation (video game) (1990), released as Cyber-Cop in the North America (1992)
 COPS (animated TV series) (1988), shown in reruns on CBS Saturday mornings under the new name CyberCOPS  (1993)